Mukdenia rossii is a plant in the saxifrage family, Saxifragaceae.

Description
Mukdenia rossii is a herbaceous plant with basal, palmate leaves, on short flowering stems. The flowers are white, borne in spring. Autumn foliage has fall colour. 

Saxifragaceae